Nolacon may refer to:
 Nolacon I, the 9th World Science Fiction Convention, 1951
 Nolacon II, the 46th World Science Fiction Convention, 1988
NolaCon (infosec conference), information security conference held annually since 2014